The Steel Swallow was a two-seater runabout produced by the Steel Swallow Automobile Company of Jackson, Michigan from 1907 to 1908.

The Steel Swallow was powered by an 8-hp 2-cylinder air-cooled engine with a friction transmission with an 84-inch wheelbase.  The vehicle cost $700 and was designed by David Dearing.  In 1908 a 'Special R.F.D.' light delivery model was available, but the company was out of business before the end of the year.

References

Further reading
 

Defunct motor vehicle manufacturers of the United States
Motor vehicle manufacturers based in Michigan
Defunct manufacturing companies based in Michigan
Brass Era vehicles
1900s cars
Cars introduced in 1907
Vehicle manufacturing companies established in 1907
Vehicle manufacturing companies disestablished in 1908